Wrought is the archaic form of "worked," the more commonly used past tense and past participle of work.

Wrought may also refer to:

 Metalworking, the process of working with metals to create individual parts, assemblies, or large-scale structures.
 Wrought iron, iron with a very low carbon content that has been wrought (hammered) by hand.

See also
 
 Wright (disambiguation)